Landstar System, Inc. is a transportation services company specializing in logistics and more specifically third-party logistics. Landstar also utilizes an extensive network of more than 11,000 independent owner operators referred to internally as BCO’s (business capacity owners). Landstar provides services principally throughout the United States and to a lesser extent in Canada and between the U.S. and Canada, Mexico and other countries around the world.

History 
The company headquarters are in Jacksonville, Florida. Landstar has been in business since 1968 and was incorporated in 1991.

In January 2014, Landstar sold its National Logistics Management (NLM) subsidiary to XPO Logistics for $87m. Using proprietary web-based software to provide management services for customers and carriers, NLM became the largest web-based expediter in North America. In January 2017, Landstar opened its Landstar U.S./Mexico Logistics Service Center in Laredo, Texas.

Business model 
Landstar includes over 10,000 owner-operators in the United States, Canada and Mexico. The BCO's (Business Capacity Operators) are not forced dispatch like traditional trucking companies. Rather, they can choose their own loads.  Landstar has agents in the United States and Canada.  

Landstar currently offers scholarships and has a nonprofit "benevolence fund" to assist Landstar operators.

References

External links

Logistics companies of the United States
Companies in the Dow Jones Transportation Average
Transport companies established in 1968
Companies based in Jacksonville, Florida
Trucking companies of the United States
Companies listed on the Nasdaq
Transportation companies based in Florida
Publicly traded companies based in Jacksonville, Florida
Multinational companies based in Jacksonville